Philip Matante (25 December 1912 – 25 October 1979)  was a Motswana nationalist activist and founder of the Botswana People's Party.

Legacy
Phillip Gaonwe Matante International Airport was named in Philip Matante's honor.

References

1912 births
1979 deaths
Botswana politicians
Members of the African National Congress
Military personnel of World War II
Bechuanaland in World War II
Botswana independence activists